The Reisbach is a  left bank tributary of the Wieslauter in the eastern Wasgau, the southern part of the Palatine Forest in Germany and northern part of the Vosges in France.

Course 
The Reisbach rises in the vicinity of the hamlet of  near Böllenborn and flows in a southerly direction. After just under 2 kilometres it forms the municipal boundary between Schweigen-Rechtenbach and Bobenthal, before it empties into the Wieslauter shortly before  in the municipality of Bobenthal.

See also 
List of rivers of Rhineland-Palatinate

References 

Rivers of Rhineland-Palatinate
Rivers and lakes of the Palatinate Forest
Südwestpfalz
South Palatinate
Rivers of Germany